Billy Ray Thunder (born William Ray Higginbottom) is an American professional rodeo cowboy who specializes in bull rider and bareback bronc riding. He has been active for over 30 years. He is nicknamed "The Living Legend".

Early life
Billy Ray Higginbottom was born in Akron, Ohio, on September 20, 1954. He has African-American heritage from both of his parents, and his father had been a local expert on horses.  Billy Ray identifies as a Black Indian, saying his grandfather was "a Heron black American." Thunder is 6'3" tall and weights 225 pounds.

Education
He attended Archbishop Hoban High School from 1969 to 1973, where he was a defensive end on the school football team. After graduating in 1973, he joined the Army, followed by a stint in the Navy before re-enlisting in the Army. He then transitioned to attempt professional football.

Career
While in the service, Billy Ray was also part of a semi-pro football team in Germany. He tried out for the Washington Redskins and the Dallas Cowboys, but did not make either team. After a short stint at the University of Akron, Billy Ray discovered riding.

His stepbrother, Anthony Winfield, invited Billy Ray to a rodeo in Georgia, where he was going to do some bull riding. African Americans left the South and an agrarian lifestyle in a series of migrations during the early part of the 20th century. Rodeos, horses, bulls and access to them are few, and far between, in modern-day cities. The portrayal of "The Wild, Wild West," cowboys and rodeos as all white, or nearly all white, and has not  made a career in rodeo any attractive to most urbanized African Americans.

As the story goes, Billy Ray met some buckle bunnies there and wishing to impress them, bragged about his riding skills. His stepbrother offered to loan his outfit and set everything up for him to show off his non-existent riding skills. Anthony and Billy Ray agreed that Billy Ray would mount up and ready himself, inside the gate, on top of a 2,000-pound bull. Anthony was supposed to pull him off before the gate opened, but Anthony did not pull him off, and Billy Ray ended up in the hospital with a couple of broken ribs, and the girl by his side. For the next 19 years, Billy Ray rode bulls in a number of pro-rodeo events around the world sanctioned by the Rodeo Cowboys Association (RCA), which was later renamed the Professional Rodeo Cowboys Association (PRCA), and the International Professional Rodeo Association (IPRA). Most recently, Billy Ray has been riding bucking horses.

His long career places him in the senior category. Many rodeo cowboys do not continue to compete professionally beyond their 30s. When Billy Ray began, as with jockeys, the majority of bull riders and bareback bronc riders are much smaller than Billy Ray.

Mentoring
Billy Ray has worked to motivate young Black people to engage in the rodeo tradition of America's black cowboys, like Bill Pickett, Nat Love, Bose Ikard, James Beckwourth, Stagecoach Mary and Bass Reeves. Each of these individuals made notable contributions to the American cowboy tradition and the history of the American West. Billy Ray has counseled and mentored youths about all the ways they can begin to be involved in the continuation of an American tradition and earn college scholarships.

References

External links
 An Eye Popping Story About Billy Ray Thunder!
 What the heck is a Thunderette?
 WPBRF Ouch Cowboy gets knocked out

1954 births
Living people
African-American players of American football
African-American sportsmen
American people who self-identify as being of Native American descent
Bareback bronc riders
Bull riders
Cowboys
Sportspeople from Akron, Ohio
Sportspeople from Atlanta
21st-century African-American people
20th-century African-American sportspeople